Przemysław Szabat (born October 19, 1985 in Trzebinia, Poland) is a Polish footballer who plays as defender. He is a graduate of the Wisła Kraków reserve squad.

References

External links
 

1985 births
Polish footballers
Wisła Kraków players
Living people
People from Chrzanów County
Świt Nowy Dwór Mazowiecki players
Sportspeople from Lesser Poland Voivodeship
Association football defenders
Wisła Płock players
Polonia Warsaw players